David Robert Stuart Cutler (born October 17, 1945) is a former all-star place kicker with the Edmonton Eskimos of the Canadian Football League. Cutler is considered by many to be the best field goal kicker in CFL history.

CFL
A graduate of Simon Fraser University, and playing his entire 16-year career with the Eskimos, Cutler is the team's all time point scorer, with 2237. He was an all star 4 times and was a member of 6 Grey Cup winning teams, including being an essential part of their great 5 win (1978–1982) dynasty. One of his most memorable plays occurred with only seconds remaining in the 69th Grey Cup game of 1981 against Ottawa, where his field goal was not only game winning, but dynasty extending. His kick capped one of the most dramatic comebacks in Grey Cup history, as the Eskimos were down by 19 points at half-time.

Awards and honors
Cutler is a member of the Simon Fraser University Sports Hall of Fame, the Edmonton Eskimos Wall of Honour, the Canadian Football Hall of Fame, and in 2016 was inducted into the BC Sports Hall of Fame.

References

1945 births
Living people
Canadian Football Hall of Fame inductees
Canadian football placekickers
Edmonton Elks players
People from Biggar, Saskatchewan
Players of Canadian football from Saskatchewan
Simon Fraser Clan football players